Waves and the Both of Us is the debut album by Charlotte Sometimes. It was released on May 6, 2008.

Reception
The album met with positive reviews, drawing frequent comparisons to Fiona Apple.

Track listing
"Losing Sleep" - (Charlotte Sometimes) 3:50
"How I Could Just Kill a Man" - (Sam Hollander, Dave Katz, Sometimes) 2:53
"Waves and the Both of Us" - (Hollander, Katz, Sometimes) – 3:36
"Sweet Valium High" - (Hollander, Katz, Sometimes) – 2:40
"Ex Girlfriend Syndrome" - (Sometimes) – 3:09
"AEIOU" –   (Hollander, Katz, Sometimes) 3:10
"Toy Soldier" –   (Hollander, Katz, Sometimes) 2:55
"This Is Only for Now" – (Hollander, Katz, Sometimes) 2:54
"In Your Apartment" – (Sometimes) 3:54
"Army Men" – (Sometimes) 3:34
"Build the Moon" - (Sometimes) 4:17
"Pilot" - (Alex Houton, Sometimes) 3:14
"Losing Sleep (Acoustic) [iTunes Bonus Track]"  - (Charlotte Sometimes) 3:50
"How I Could Just Kill a Man (Acoustic) [iTunes Bonus Track]"  –(Sam Hollander, Dave Katz, Sometimes) 2:53

The song "How I Could Just Kill a Man" was named after the 1991 Cypress Hill song of the same name.

Personnel
Charlotte Sometimes (Jessica Charlotte Poland) – Lead vocals, guitar, songwriting
Coley O'Toole– Keyboards, backing vocals
Spencer Peterson – Drums
PJ Bond – Guitar
Shaun Savage – Bass

Charts

References

2008 debut albums
Charlotte Sometimes (musician) albums
Albums produced by S*A*M and Sluggo
Geffen Records albums